Hudson Valley Credit Union (Formerly Hudson Valley Federal Credit Union) is a credit union serving the New York counties of Dutchess, Orange, Ulster, Putnam, Rockland, Westchester, Greene, Columbia, Albany, Rensselaer, Schenectady, and Saratoga. Founded in 1963 in Poughkeepsie, New York, the institution has 287,000+ members and over 800 employees as of March 2017. HVCU is one of the largest credit unions in the United States with assets totaling more than $5.95 billion as of June 2020.

Mary Madden held the position as CEO from May of 2002 until September of 2022. She was succeeded by Jonathan Roberts.

History
The credit union was founded in October, 1963, by IBM employees in Poughkeepsie and Fishkill, New York.  Membership requirements were changed to allow those who live, work, worship, volunteer, or attend school in Dutchess, Orange, or Ulster counties to join the credit union as of 2003.

A state charter for the credit union was granted September 4, 2019. As a result, HVCU now services 12 counties, as opposed to four before the charter conversion.  The credit union's name was changed to Hudson Valley Credit Union on October 4, 2019.

Recognition
The credit union was named in 2015 as a workplace with good employee benefits.

References

External links
 official site

Credit unions based in New York (state)
Companies based in Dutchess County, New York
Poughkeepsie, New York
Organizations based in New York (state)
Banks established in 1963
1963 establishments in New York (state)